KULM-FM 98.3 FM is a terrestrial FM radio station licensed to Columbus, Texas.  The station broadcasts a country music format and is owned by Roy E. Henderson, through licensee S Content Marketing, LLC.

History
KULM-FM was first proposed by John L. Labay of Columbus, as a 3 kilowatt Class A facility in 1972. A construction permit to build a transmission tower on U.S. Highway 90, 2 miles west of downtown Columbus, was granted on March 8, 1973. The KULM-FM callsign was assigned to the facility on May 3, 1973. Labay constructed the facility and received a License to Cover on August 1, 1974. KULM-FM increased ERP to the current 6 kilowatt maximum for a Class A licensed facility in 1993.

References

External links
KULM-FM's official website

ULM-FM
Country radio stations in the United States